The 1972–73 Liga Bet season saw Hapoel Kiryat Ata, Hapoel Netanya, Maccabi Holon and SK Nes Tziona win their regional divisions and promoted to Liga Alef.

North Division A

North Division B

South Division A

South Division B

References
Tables Davar, 4.6.73, Historical Jewish Press 
Hapoel Netanya and Nes Tziona secured Liga Alef promotion Maariv, 3.6.73, Historical Jewish Press 

Liga Bet seasons
Israel
3